Pristen is the name of several inhabited localities in Russia.

Urban localities
Pristen, Pristensky District, Kursk Oblast, a work settlement in Pristensky District, Kursk Oblast

Rural localities
Pristen, Rovensky District, Belgorod Oblast, a selo in Aydarsky Rural Okrug of Rovensky District of Belgorod Oblast
Pristen (khutor), Shebekinsky District, Belgorod Oblast, a khutor in Shebekinsky District, Belgorod Oblast
Pristen (selo), Shebekinsky District, Belgorod Oblast, a selo in Shebekinsky District, Belgorod Oblast
Pristen, Valuysky District, Belgorod Oblast, a selo in Yablonovsky Rural Okrug of Valuysky District of Belgorod Oblast
Pristen, Lgovsky District, Kursk Oblast, a village in Banishchansky Selsoviet of Lgovsky District of Kursk Oblast